Jonathan Harty (born April 7, 1988) is a German born Canadian professional ice hockey defenceman, currently playing for Fehérvár AV19 of the Austrian Hockey League (EBEL).

Playing career
After a four-year major junior career with the Everett Silvertips of the Western Hockey League, Harty played collegiate hockey with the University of New Brunswick of the Canadian Interuniversity Sport. Upon completion of a decorated career with the Varsity Reds, Harty began his professional career at the tail end of the 2011–12 season in the ECHL with the Kalamazoo Wings.

With limited North American interest, Harty signed his first full professional contract in France with Ducs d'Angers of the Ligue Magnus on June 12, 2012. In re-uniting with previous junior Silvertips assistant coach Jay Varady, Harty competed in 18 games with the league-leading "Ducs" (= 	
long-eared owl) to compile two goals and 11 points in the 2012–13 season.

On June 1, 2013, Harty left the French league as a free agent and signed a one-year contract with Swedish HockeyAllsvenskan club, Mora IK. On June 23, 2014, Harty signed a one-year contract with fellow HockeyAllsvenskan team IF Björklöven.

After spending a second season in the French Ligue Magnus with Brûleurs de Loups, Harty left as a free agent to sign a one-year contract with Slovenian outfit, HDD Olimpija Ljubljana of the Austrian EBEL on July 8, 2016.

Career statistics

Regular season and playoffs

International

Awards and honours

References

External links

1988 births
Living people
Fehérvár AV19 players
IF Björklöven players
Brûleurs de Loups players
Canadian ice hockey defencemen
Ducs d'Angers players
Everett Silvertips players
HDD Olimpija Ljubljana players
Heilbronner Falken players
Kalamazoo Wings (ECHL) players
Mora IK players
Canadian expatriate ice hockey players in France
Canadian expatriate ice hockey players in Sweden